The list includes victories by Islamic Republic of Iran Air Force during the Iran–Iraq War.

List of confirmed victories

List of pilots

References

Notes

Citations

Sources 
 
 
 
 
 
 

Iranian aviators
Airstrikes during the Iran–Iraq War
Iran–Iraq War flying aces
aerial victories during the Iran-Iraq war